VKCDB (Voltage-gated potassium Channel DataBase) is a database of functional data about the voltage-gated potassium channels.

See also
 Voltage-gated potassium channel

References

External links
 http://vkcdb.biology.ualberta.ca

Biological databases
Electrophysiology
Ion channels